Harvey is an English family and given name derived from the Old Breton name Huiarnviu, derived from the elements hoiarn, huiarn (modern Breton houarn) meaning "iron" and viu (Breton bev) meaning "blazing". It is related to Old Welsh Haarnbiu.

Surname
 Harvey brothers, family of cricketers from Fitzroy, inner-city Melbourne, Victoria, Australia
 Merv Harvey (1918–1995), played one Test for Australia in January 1947 and captained Victoria five times
 Robert Harvey (footballer), Australian rules footballer for St Kilda and grandson of Merv
 Anthony Harvey (footballer), Australian rules footballer for St Kilda and grandson of Merv
 Mick Harvey (umpire) (born 1921), played for Victoria and Queensland, later became a Test umpire
 Ray Harvey (born 1926), played for Victoria
 Neil Harvey (born 1928), played 79 Tests for Australia, member of the Australian Cricket Hall of Fame

A–F
 Alan Harvey (born 1942), Canadian soccer player
 Alexander Harvey II (1923–2017), American judge
 Alex Harvey (musician) (1935–1982), Scottish blues/rock musician
 Alex Harvey (curler), Scottish wheelchair curler
 Alfred Harvey, comic-book publisher
 André Harvey (MP) (born 1941), Canadian consultant, politician and former teacher
 André Harvey (sculptor) (1941–2018), American sculptor
 Anthony Harvey (1930–2017), British film director and editor
 Arthur Harvey (disambiguation)
 Aryana Harvey (born 1997), American women's soccer player
 Bagenal Harvey (died 1798), United Irishmen commander
 Ben Harvey (disambiguation), several people
 Brian Harvey, musician
 Bryan Harvey (musician), American musician
 Catherine Harvey (later Caughey, 1923–2008), British Colossus computer operator at Bletchley Park during World War II
 Charles Malcolm Barclay-Harvey (1890–1969), British politician and Governor of South Australia in 1944
 Colin Harvey (born 1944), British soccer player and manager
 Cynthia Harvey (born 1957), American ballet dancer, ballet mistress and educator
 Cynthia Fierro Harvey, United Methodist Church bishop
 David Harvey (born 1935), British-born Marxist geographer
 David Harvey (footballer) (born 1948), British soccer player
 Dee Harvey (1965–2012), American R&B singer
 Domino Harvey (1969–2005), British-born model turned Los Angeles bounty hunter
 Don Harvey (disambiguation), several people
 Doug Harvey (ice hockey) (1924–1989), star player for the NHL's Montreal Canadiens
 Doug Harvey (umpire) (born 1930), American baseball umpire elected to the Baseball Hall of Fame
 Edward Harvey (1783–1865), British admiral
 Eliab Harvey (1758–1830), Admiral in the Royal navy, captained HMS Temeraire at Trafalgar
 Francis Harvey (1873–1916), British Marine awarded the Victoria Cross posthumously
 Francis Harvey (poet) (1925–2014), poet and playwright
 Francis J. Harvey (born 1943), American military administrator
 Francis Harvey (died 1632), MP for Aldeburgh
 Francis Harvey (MP for Colchester) (1534–1602), English politician
 Francis Harvey (MP for Northampton) (1611–1703), English lawyer and politician
 Frank Harvey (cricketer) (1864–1939), English sportsman
 Frank Harvey (playwright) (1842–1903), English father of Australian screenwriter
 Frank Harvey (priest) (1930–1986), Anglican Archdeacon of London
 Frank Harvey (Australian screenwriter) (1885–1965), English-born actor, producer and writer
 Frank Harvey (English screenwriter) (1912–1981), award-winning son of the above screenwriter
 Fred Harvey (entrepreneur) (1835–1901), American developer of Harvey House restaurants

G–L
 Gabriel Harvey (c. 1552 or 1553 – 1631), English writer
 Geoff Harvey (1935–2019), Australian musician and television personality
George Harvey (died 1834), English mathematician
 George Harvey (1806-1876), Scottish painter
 George Brinton McClellan Harvey (1864-1928), American journalist, businessman,  publisher, ambassador 
 George U. Harvey (1881-1946), Irish born politician in Queens, New York
 Gerry Harvey (born 1939), Australian businessman, co-founder of the Harvey Norman chain stores
 Graham Harvey (religious studies scholar) (born 1959), English scholar
 Grant Harvey (born 1984), Canadian film director
 Guy Harvey (born 1955), Jamaican marine wildlife artist and conservationist
 Hayward A. Harvey (1824–1893), American engineer and inventor of Harvey armor
 Harry Harvey Sr. (1901–1985), Actor
 Henry Harvey (1743–1810), British admiral
 Herk Harvey (1924–1996), American film director, actor, and film producer
 Hunter Harvey (born 1994), American baseball player
 Ian Harvey (rugby union) (1903–1966), New Zealand rugby union player
 James B. Harvey 
 James Michael Harvey (born 1949), American Roman Catholic archbishop
 Jane Harvey (writer) (1771–1848) British poet and novelist
 Jeffrey Harvey (biologist) (born 1957), Canadian ecologist and journalist
 Jeffrey A. Harvey (born 1955), American theoretical physicist
 Joe Harvey (1918–1989), English footballer and manager
 John Harvey (Royal Navy officer) (1740–1794), officer of the Royal Navy and captain of HMS Brunswick
 John Harvey (announcer), American television presenter
 John Anthony Harvey, British entrepreneur and logistician
 Jonathan Harvey (composer) (1939–2012), British composer
 Ken Harvey (baseball) (born 1978), American baseball player
 Kyle Harvey (born 1993), American rapper known professionally as Kyle
 Laning Harvey (1882-1942), Pennsylvania state senator
 Laura Harvey (born 1980), English footballer and manager
 Laurence Harvey (1928–1973), Lithuanian-born actor
 Lawson Harvey (1856–1920), Justice of the Indiana Supreme Court
 Leslie Harvey, Scottish rock musician
 Liza Harvey, (born 1966), Australian politician
 Louis P. Harvey (1820–1862), American politician and governor of Wisconsin
 Luc Harvey (born 1964), Canadian politician

M–Z
 Magali Harvey (born 1990), Canadian rugby player; daughter of Luc Harvey
 Mandy Harvey  (born 1988), deaf singer/songwriter
 Marisa Harvey (born 1975), former Maltese footballer
 Martin Harvey (1941–2019), Northern Irish footballer
 Matt Harvey (born 1989), major league baseball player
 Michael Harvey (disambiguation), several people
 Monique Harvey (1950–2001), Canadian painter
 Nate Harvey (born 1996), American football player
 Neil Harvey (born 1928), Australian cricketer
 Nick Harvey (born 1961), British M.P.
 Norm Harvey (1899–1941), American football player
 Norman Harvey (1899–1942), English soldier
 PJ Harvey (born 1969), British singer and songwriter
 Pat Harvey (born 1955), American broadcast journalist
 Paul Harvey (1918–2009), American radio broadcaster
 Peter Harvey (baritone), (born 1958), English singer
 Peter Harvey (writer), (born 1810), American writer and known best friend of Daniel Webster
 Richard Harvey (born 1953), British composer and multi-instrumentalist
 Robert Harvey (footballer) (born 1971), Australian rules footballer
 Robert Harvey (musician), British musician
 Ronald Harvey (cricketer) (born 1934), English cricketer
 Steve Harvey (born 1956), African-American actor, entertainer and comedian
 Thomas Harvey (disambiguation), several people
 Tim Harvey (born 1961), British racing driver, winner of the BTCC in 1992 and media personality
 Todd Harvey (born 1975), Canadian ice hockey player
 Trice Harvey (1936–2017), American politician
 W. Brantley Harvey Jr. (1930–2018), American politician
 W. Brantley Harvey Sr. (1893–1981), American politician
 William Harvey (1578–1657), British physician who first proved that blood flows in a circulatory system
 William Henry Harvey (1811–1866), Irish botanist, author of Phycologia Britannica
 Willie Harvey (footballer) (1929–2014), Scottish footballer
 Willie Harvey Jr. (born 1996), American football player

Given name
 Saint Hervé (Saint Harvey), 6th-century Breton saint
 Harvey Allen (disambiguation), various people
 Harvey J. Alter, American medical researcher, virologist, physician and Nobel Prize laureate 
 Harvey Ball, creator of the smiley face
 Harvey Barnes (born 1997), English footballer
 Harvey Bennett (disambiguation), various people
 Harvey Brooks (disambiguation), various people
 Harvey Brown (disambiguation), various people
 Harvey Bullock (disambiguation), various people
 Harvey Campbell (disambiguation), various people
 Harvey Carignan, serial killer known as the Want-Ad Killer
 Harvey Catchings, American Basketball player
 Harvey Clark (disambiguation), various people
 Harvey Cox, American theologian
 Harvey Cushing, pioneer of neurosurgery
 Harvey Eakin, NASCAR racing driver
 Harvey Einbinder (1926–2013), American physicist and author
 Harvey Elliott (born 2003), English footballer
 Harvey J. Fields (1935–2014), American Reform rabbi
 Harvey Fierstein, American actor and playwright
 Harvey Fletcher, American physicist
 Harvey Samuel Firestone (1868–1938), founder of the Firestone Tire & Rubber Company
 Harvey Fisher, Musician, actor, model 
 Harvey Freeman (disambiguation), various people
 Harvey Gantt, American architect and Democratic politician 
 Harvey Glatman (1927-1959), American serial killer, rapist, kidnapper, and robber
 Harvey Goldsmith, English performing arts promoter
 Harvey Grant (born 1965), American basketball player
 Harvey Hiller (1893–1956), American baseball player
 Harvey Johnson (disambiguation), various people
 Harvey Kaye (disambiguation), various people
 Harvey Keitel, American film actor
 Harvey Korman (1927-2008), American actor
 Harvey Kurtzman, American comics creator and editor
 Harvey Kuenn (1930–1988), American baseball player, coach and manager
 Harvey Lewis (disambiguation), various people
 Harvey Lisberg, British talent manager and impresario
 Harvey Locke Carey (1915–1984), American lawyer and politician
 Harvey M. Lifset (1916–2005), New York politician
 Harvey Mandel, American guitarist
 Harvey Martin, American football player
 Harvey Mason, American jazz drummer
 Harvey Mason Jr., seven-time Grammy Award-winning American songwriter
 Harvey Milk, American politician
 Harvey Miller (disambiguation), various people
 Harvey Mudd (disambiguation), various people
 Harvey Parker (disambiguation), various people
 Harvey N. Paulson (1903-1993), American farmer and politician
 Harvey Pekar (1939–2010), American comics writer
 Harvey Penick, American golfer and coach
 Harvey Postlethwaite, British Engineer and Formula One technical director
 Harvey Price (disambiguation), various people
 Harvey Proctor (born 1947), British Conservative Member of Parliament
 Harvey Sark (1907–1964), American football player
 Harvey Scales (1940–2019), American R&B and soul singer-songwriter
 Harvey Shapiro (disambiguation), various people
 Harvey Smith (disambiguation), various people
 Harvey Soning (born 1944), British property consultant and developer
 Harvey G. Stenger, President of Binghamton University
 Harvey Edwin Swennes (1899-1964), American newspaper editor, publisher, and politician
 Harvey Washington Walter (1819–1878), American lawyer and railroad business executive
 Harvey Weinstein, American film producer, co-founder of Miramax Films and The Weinstein Company, and convicted sex offender
 Harvey Williams (disambiguation), various people
 Harvey White (disambiguation), various people
 Harvey Whitehill, American Frontier Sheriff
 Harvey A. Wilder (1907-1968), American farmer and politician

In fiction
 Harvey the 6′ ″ tall rabbit, appearing in:
 Mary Chase's Harvey (play)
 The 1950 comedy-drama film Harvey (film) based on the play
 Harvey Dent, the DC comics supervillain Two-Face. 
 Most widely known for his appearance in The Dark Knight (film)
 The titular character of Harvey Beaks
 Harvey Kinkle, the love interest of Sabrina the Teenage Witch
 Played by Nate Richert in Sabrina the Teenage Witch (1996 TV series).
 Played by Ross Lynch in the Netflix series Chilling Adventures of Sabrina (TV series).
 Harvey, from Thomas & Friends
 Harvey Mckenzie from the Cartoon Network animated series Codename: Kids Next Door

See also
 Hervé, Breton family name
 Harvard (name)
 Hervey
 Harvie, given name and surname

References

Celtic given names
Breton masculine given names
English masculine given names
English-language surnames
Surnames from given names